"Poison" is the debut single of American vocal group Bell Biv DeVoe, released as the first single from their debut album of the same name. The song, in the style of new jack swing, a late-1980s/early-1990s hybrid of R&B, hip hop and swing, was the group's most successful.

Background and information
The song was written and produced by Elliot Straite, AKA Dr. Freeze. Straite had originally planned to feature the song on his own album, but plans changed when the members of Bell Biv DeVoe heard his demo version. "When the guys heard it, they went nuts. I didn't think that record was going to be that big because it was a personal love letter to my ex-girlfriend at the time. It wasn't a song at first. It was a letter. When I wrote it as a song, I let a lot of my friends hear it, and they said it was weird. After that, I put the music together. I was thinking I wasn't going to be on the album because such heavyweights were already on it. I ended up having two songs on the album: 'Poison' and 'She's Dope!'." Straite cited German electronic group Kraftwerk and Latin musicians Tito Puente and Mongo Santamaria as influences on the song's sound and production.

Chart performance
On the Billboard Hot 100 singles chart, "Poison" rose from number fifty-two to number thirty-eight in the week of April 14, 1990, and eventually peaked at number three for four consecutive weeks, beginning on June 9, 1990. The single also peaked at number one on the Hot Black Singles chart for two weeks. "Poison" became one of the most successful singles of 1990 (see 1990 in music), and was a staple on MTV and mainstream radio in the summer, spending ten weeks in the Top 10. The single peaked at number seven on the dance charts. "Poison" was certified platinum by the RIAA on June 1, 1990 for sales of over one million copies.

Music video
The official music video for the song was directed by Lionel C. Martin. The predominant color is purple. It takes place at a club, an old basketball court and a schoolyard.

Charts

Weekly charts

Year-end charts

Certifications

Release history

See also
 List of number-one R&B singles of 1990 (U.S.)

References

External links
 

1990 songs
1990 debut singles
Bell Biv DeVoe songs
MCA Records singles
Music videos directed by Lionel C. Martin
New jack swing songs
Song recordings produced by Dr. Freeze
Songs written by Dr. Freeze